is a Japanese footballer currently playing as a defender for Fukushima United.

Career statistics

Club
.

Notes

References

External links
 Fukushima United FC player profile (in Japanese)

1998 births
Living people
Association football people from Osaka Prefecture
Biwako Seikei Sport College alumni
Japanese footballers
Association football defenders
J3 League players
Vissel Kobe players
Fukushima United FC players